Experiment is the second studio album by American country music singer Kane Brown. It was released on November 9, 2018, through RCA Records Nashville. The album includes the single "Lose It" and twelve other songs. Experiment was nominated for American Music Award for Favorite Country Album.

Content
Brown co-wrote all but one track on the album. In advance of the album, the tracks "Homesick", "Short Skirt Weather", and "Good as You" were released digitally. "Lose It" was the album's first radio single. Dann Huff, who co-produced Brown's debut album, is also the producer on Experiment. Brown said that he wanted to introduce new sounds on the album and introduce "more energy" to his style. "American Bad Dream" is a song that Brown wrote about the 2017 Las Vegas shooting. Brown said that he took inspiration from his grandmother, who was a police detective.

Critical reception
Giving it 4 out of 5 stars, Stephen Thomas Erlewine of AllMusic found Brown's singing and songwriting superior to his 2016 debut album, while also noting influences of contemporary R&B and arena rock. Rolling Stone reviewer Maura Johnston rated it 3.5 out of 5 stars, highlighting "American Bad Dream" as the "emotional center" while also noting the variety of musical influences and the "confidence" in Brown's delivery.

Commercial performance
Experiment debuted at number one on the US Billboard 200 with 124,000 album-equivalent units (including 105,000 pure album sales), making it Brown's first US number-one album, and the third country album to top the chart in 2018. The album was certified Gold by the RIAA on March 18, 2019, and Platinum on March 17, 2020.  As of March 2020, the album has sold 242,400 copies, with 886,000 units in combined sales, tracks and streams consumed in the United States.

Track listing
All tracks are produced by Dann Huff.

Personnel

Kane Brown – lead vocals
Dann Huff – bouzouki, dobro, electric guitar, gut string guitar, keyboards, piano, programming, sitar, soloist
Brock Berryhill – programming
Ben Caver – backing vocals
Corey Crowder – programming
Charles Dixon – strings
Stuart Duncan – fiddle
Sam Ellis – programming
Paul Franklin – steel guitar
Becky G – featured vocals on "Lost in the Middle of Nowhere"
David Huff – programming
Charlie Judge – keyboards, programming, string arrangements, synthesizer
Russ Pahl – steel guitar
Jimmie Lee Sloas – bass guitar
Aaron Sterling – drums, tambour
Russell Terrell – background vocals
Ilya Toshinsky – banjo, bouzouki, dobro, acoustic guitar, resonator guitar, mandolin
Will Weatherly – programming
Derek Wells – electric guitar, slide guitar

Charts

Weekly charts

Year-end charts

Certifications

References

2018 albums
Kane Brown albums
RCA Records albums
Albums produced by Dann Huff